Vicci is a given name, or shortened or familiar for Victoria (name). People who use this name are:

 Vicci Laine (born 1960), American transgender performer and activist
 Vicci Martinez (born 1984), American singer/songwriter

See also
 Vici (disambiguation)
 Vicky (disambiguation)
 Vikki (disambiguation)